During the 1971–72 English football season, Brentford competed in the Football League Fourth Division. The club led the division for much of the first half of the season and 10 wins in the final 14 matches secured automatic promotion with a 3rd-place finish.

Season summary 
Despite the reduction of the club's debt to a manageable level and an average attendance higher than all but the top three finishers in the Third Division, Fourth Division Brentford went into the 1971–72 season with a squad of just 14 professionals. Long-time goalkeeper Chic Brodie was released, as was bit-part winger Brian Tawse and in came two defensive youngsters on free transfers – Terry Scales and Steven Tom.

Despite the club record £30,000 departure of Roger Cross to rivals Fulham and Alan Hawley also moving to Craven Cottage on loan, Brentford's 12-man squad met pre-season expectations in the early part of the season, holding onto top spot intermittently until a minor blip in October and November 1971. Utility player Michael Allen was signed from Middlesbrough for an £8,000 fee in October and proved to be a vital cog in the midfield. The team owed much of its success to prolific goalscoring from John O'Mara, with the centre forward reaching 20 goals for the season after a 6–2 thrashing of Darlington on 8 January 1972, a result which made Brentford the top scorers in the Football League and was also notable for a 13-minute hattrick from John Docherty.

After another blip caused by the suspension of John O'Mara for five weeks dropped Brentford out of the promotion places, the team was buoyed by the loan signing of winger Stewart Houston and entered the final five weeks of the season strongly, winning five matches in a row in March. Two draws and a defeat over Easter threatened to drop the Bees out of the promotion places, but four successive wins meant that automatic promotion was assured with two matches to play, when captain Bobby Ross' penalty was enough to beat Exeter City at Griffin Park on 22 April. Despite going top of the Fourth Division after victory over Barrow in the following match, a 3–0 defeat away to Workington in the final match of the season dropped the Bees to a 3rd-place finish.

Two club records were set during the season: 
 Most clean sheets in a Football League season: 22 – Gordon Phillips
 Fewest players used in a Football League season: 14
Brentford finished top of the Fourth Division charts in the following statistical categories:
 Best away record
 Highest overall goal difference
 Highest away goal difference
 Highest average attendance

League table

Results
Brentford's goal tally listed first.

Legend

Pre-season and friendlies

Football League Fourth Division

FA Cup

Football League Cup 

 Sources: 100 Years of Brentford, The Big Brentford Book of the Seventies,Croxford, Lane & Waterman, p. 300. Statto

Playing squad 
Players' ages are as of the opening day of the 1971–72 season.

 Sources: The Big Brentford Book of the Seventies, Timeless Bees

Coaching staff

Statistics

Appearances and goals
Substitute appearances in brackets.

Players listed in italics left the club mid-season.
Source: 100 Years of Brentford

Goalscorers 

Players listed in italics left the club mid-season.
Source: 100 Years of Brentford

Management

Summary

Transfers & loans

Awards 
 Supporters' Player of the Year: John O'Mara
 Players' Player of the Year: Jackie Graham
 Gallaghers Divisional Footballer of the Year: John O'Mara
 Football League Fourth Division Manager of the Month: Frank Blunstone (September 1971, March 1972)

References 

Brentford F.C. seasons
Brentford